Klipheuvel is a town in Capricorn District Municipality in the Limpopo province of South Africa.

References

Populated places in the Lepelle-Nkumpi Local Municipality